The Trachoecidae is an extinct taxonomic family of fossil sea snails, marine gastropod mollusks in the superfamily Mathildoidea.

References 

 The Taxonomicon